Luzhki is a rural locality (a village) in Unechsky District, Bryansk Oblast, Russia. The population was 49 as of 2010. There are two streets.

Geography 
Luzhki is located 26 km southeast of Unecha (the district's administrative center) by road. Trukhanovo is the nearest rural locality.

References 

Rural localities in Unechsky District